The Lalitha Mahal, now renamed Lalitha Mahal Palace Hotel, is a luxury hotel-turned royal resident and the second largest palace in the southern Indian city of Mysore, Karnataka, after the Mysore Palace. It is located near the Chamundi Hills, east of the city. The palace was built in 1921 by Maharaja Krishnaraja Wodeyar IV for the exclusive stay of the Governor-General of India.
Built on a raised ground, the palace was fashioned on the lines of St Paul's Cathedral in London and is one of the imposing structures in Mysore.

The palace is painted pure white. It was converted into a heritage hotel in 1974. It was run as a part of the Ashok Group of the India Tourism Development Corporation (ITDC) under the Government of India until 2018 when it was transferred to a unit of the Government of Karnataka. However, a veneer of the original royal ambience of the palace is maintained.

History
The Lalitha Mahal palace dates to the early 20th century, built during the Kingdom of Mysore and British India. The palace was constructed with a reasonable amount of money out of the kingdom's annual income of two million pounds at that time. The palace was built in 1921 initially for the exclusive stay of the Governor-General of India and subsequently used as a guest house for European guests of the Maharaja.

Architecture

Set amidst sprawling landscaped gardens below the Chamundi hills, the palace was planned by E.W. Fritchley, the architect from Bombay (now renamed Mumbai) and constructed by B Munivenkatappa. The palace built in Renaissance architectural style is considered an adaptation of the St. Paul's Cathedral in London, particularly the central dome. The architecture of the palace reflects English manor houses and Italian Palazzos. It is a two storied structure. The supporting structure of the palace is of Ionic double column. At the ground level, there is a projecting porch. Spherical domes with the dominating central dome sets the front elevation of the palace. Decorative stained glass has been extensively used to enhance the elegance of the palace both in the exterior facades and in interiors doors, windows and ceilings. A lovely view of the Chamundi Hill to the left and the Mysore city in front of the palace is seen from the balcony upstairs.

The palace has exquisitely designed viceroy room, a banquet hall, a dancing floor and an Italian marble staircase (has an arresting curve) and also embellished with small ornamentations, which are said to be replicas from various palaces in Britain. The full length portraits of the Wodeyar Kings, Italian marble floors and Belgian crystal chandeliers, cut glass lamps, heavy ornate furniture, mosaic tiles and a couple of exquisite Persian carpets gives the palace its regal ambience. With conversion of the palace into a heritage hotel, interiors have been modified to provide for modern conveniences but most of the earlier sections of the palace such as the dancing and banquet halls have been retained in their original elegance but adopted as dining halls and conference halls for holding meetings and conventions; these have polished wooden flooring and three stain glassed domes in the ceiling. The ball room in particular, which has been converted into the Dining Hall of the hotel, is a baroque hall with immensely high ceiling with domed skylights made of Belgian glass. A swimming pool is now an additional provision. The elevator, carpeting and the Ottoman, upholstered with tapestry are treasured items in the palace.

Gallery

See also
List of Heritage Buildings in Mysore

References

Palaces in Mysore
Hotels in Mysore
1921 establishments in India
Buildings and structures completed in 1921
Hotels established in 1974
Heritage hotels in India
Royal residences in India
20th-century architecture in India